Kendra Stearns O'Donnell (born 1944) is an American educator and painter who served as the 12th principal of Phillips Exeter Academy.

Biography
She attended Emma Willard School, graduating in 1960, Barnard College, graduating in 1965, and Columbia University, where she received an M.A. and Ph.D. degree in English. As an assistant professor of English at Princeton University, entering the faculty in 1971, she received, as the first woman to do so, the title of university marshal. She served as a program officer at the Markle Foundation, the program director of the Arthur Vining Davis Foundations, and as a consultant and special assistant to the president of the Rockefeller Brothers Fund. She became the first female principal of Exeter in 1987, and served until her retirement 1997. During her time at Exeter, she received significant press coverage over her handling of a scandal involving the firing of a drama teacher, Larry Lane Bateman, over child pornography charges in 1992.

She currently serves as a member of the board of trustees at the Hotchkiss School; Emma Willard School, where she served as the president of the board prior to becoming principal of Exeter; and the Currier Museum of Art. Past positions of hers include the director of the New Hampshire Charitable Foundation and the vice-president of the board of the Society for the Protection of New Hampshire Forests.

O'Donnell is married to Patrick O'Donnell, with whom she has three children, two of which are from a previous marriage. She has received honorary degrees from New England College and Hamilton College.

References 

1944 births
Living people
Emma Willard School alumni
Barnard College alumni
Columbia Graduate School of Arts and Sciences alumni
Princeton University faculty
Phillips Exeter Academy faculty
20th-century American women educators
20th-century American educators
American women academics
21st-century American women